Blind Husbands is a 1919 American drama film written and directed by Erich von Stroheim. The film is an adaptation of the story The Pinnacle by Stroheim.

Plot
A group of holiday-makers arrive at Cortina d'Ampezzo, an Alpine village in the Dolomites. Among them are an American Doctor who does not pay much attention to his wife and an Austrian Lieutenant, who decides to seduce her. He manages to befriend the couple so that, when the Doctor has to leave to help a local physician, he asks the Lieutenant to look after his wife. When the Lieutenant becomes too pressing, she promises to leave with him but asks him to give her more time. During the night, she puts a letter under the door of his bedroom.

The Doctor goes on a climbing expedition with the Lieutenant, who had been bragging about his exploits as a mountaineer. In fact, he is not in very good shape and the Doctor must help him to reach the summit. In the process, the Doctor finds his wife's letter in the pocket of the Lieutenant's jacket, but before he can read it, the Lieutenant throws it away. He asks the Lieutenant whether his wife had promised to leave with him and the Lieutenant gives a positive answer. The Doctor decides to leave him on the summit and starts his descent, despite the Lieutenant now saying that he has been lying because he thought the Doctor would not believe the truth. On his way back, the Doctor finds his wife's letter, in which she had written that she loved only her husband and asked the Lieutenant not to bother her any longer with his attentions. While pondering whether he should go back to get the Lieutenant, he loses his balance and falls down. When the Doctor is finally saved by soldiers, he asks them to go and help the Lieutenant. Before they can reach him, the Lieutenant, attacked by vultures, falls to his death from the precipice.

Cast

Background

Von Stroheim entered the Hollywood film industry in 1914 as an extra and horse handler on the greatest cinematic spectacle of the period, D. W. Griffith’s The Birth of a Nation (1915). Von Stroheim made persistent, but futile efforts to find work with the Griffith production unit after filming was completed.  By chance, he had an encounter with Broadway director John Emerson, impressing him with his sartorial knowledge of formal military dress. This led to a small role in a film adaption of Ibsen’s Ghosts with Mutual Film productions, followed by his first screen-credited feature later that year in Farewell to Thee (1915). Emerson soon enlisted von Stroheim to serve “as actor, assistant and technical advisor” on the 1915 production of Old Heidelberg (1915), beginning a two-year professional relationship and “the single most important influence on von Stroheim’s early career.”  Von Stroheim’s fortunes rose with those of Emerson when the producer obtained a contract to direct a number of features starring Douglas Fairbanks.

While working as production manager on an adaption of Shakespeare’s Macbeth for the Triangle Fine Arts studio, von Stroheim was impressed into service as one of several assistant directors on Griffith’s massive production Intolerance (1916). Von Stroheim may have set up a number of shots in this so-called “modern” episode of the epic production.

Though never one of Griffith’s inner circle, von Stroheim apprenticeship imbued him with the director’s—his obsession with linking settings with his players character development. The “fussy perfectionism” and attention to detail displayed by von Stroheim in his own films is a legacy of Griffith’s profound influence.

With the United States’ entry into the First World War in 1917 against Germany, the Hollywood studios and distributors became anxious about presenting audiences with “Teutonic” figures. Von Stroheim name was dropped from cast billings, then he was discharged entirely from Douglas Fairbank’s production company. When the studios turned to pro-American, pro-war and anti-German propaganda films, opportunities arose for actors who could convincingly portray Prussian military villains. Von Stroheim “took advantage of his looks, name and reputation, and carved out a new career as a professional Hun.”

As an expert in German military uniforms and paraphernalia, Von Stroheim returned to Paramount Pictures to serve as advisor to D. W. Griffith on Hearts of the World and at Famous Players-Lasky on The Hun Within, both 1918.

When von Stroheim was hired by Universal Studios to star in The Heart of Humanity (1918) opposite Dorothy Phillips, he came prepared to contribute his “eagerness and proficiency” to every aspect of the production. Possessing directorial expertise acquired under Griffith’s influence, Von Stroheim “honestly felt himself to be Griffith’s true heir.” His inflammatory portrayal of Prussian lieutenant Eric von Eberhard, von Stroheim made his screen image notorious to the American public, particularly a scene in which he snatches an infant from its cradle and casts it from a two-story window.

Pre-Production

At the peak of the Spanish Influenza in late 1918, von Stroheim attempted to interest film studios in his script-in-progress entitled The Pinnacle, concerning an American couple and an Austrian Lieutenant in a ménage à trois.
 
He decided his best prospect for funding would be Carl Laemmle at Universal studios, where von Stroheim had recently completed the profitable The Heart of Humanity. Laemmle, of German birth and ethnicity was known to hire German-speaking countrymen, an important consideration for von Stroheim when post-war “anti-German hysteria” briefly persisted in the United States. Unlike other established studios such as Paramount and First National Pictures that often produced elaborate and expensive features with top-rank stars, Laemmle’s vast Universal operation churned out relatively low-budget movies and offered parsimonious contracts for its actors and technicians, ensuring a high turnover.

Considering Universal’s frequent need for experienced staff, Von Stroheim approached Laemmle confident that he could enlist the producer in the project with two enticements: von Stroheim would hand over the story and script, gratis, and waive all wages for directing the picture. The only caveat was $200 per week to star in the film. After a short, intense interview, von Stroheim won the support of the movie mogul. The budget for the film was initially estimated at $25,000, and von Stroheim immediately began casting the production for The Pinnacle began on 3 April 1919.

Production

Like Griffith, von Stroheim was averse to hiring theater trained actors and established screen “stars”, preferring to assemble a stock company from “untrained talent” whom he would mentor to achieve his cinematic goals. Actors Francelia Billington and Sam de Grasse would play the American couple on vacation in the Dolomite Alps, both who had been Mutual players. British actor Gibson Gowland would play the mountain guide, Silent Sepp Innerkofler, and later star as McTeague in von Stroheim’s Greed (1924).  Von Stroheim played the meddling lover Lieutenant Eric Von Steuben.

An indication of Laemmle’s determination to assure a commercially impressive production, he provided von Stroheim with their top cinematographers Ben Reynolds, and assistant William Daniels, both of whom would serve with the director until he moved to Metro-Goldwyn-Mayer in 1924.

By the time  shooting of Blind Husbands was completed on 12 June 1919, the costs had far exceeded the initial budget estimate. Combined film stock and advertising expenses had reached over $250,000. As such, Blind Husbands emerged as a critically important project. Universal’s response was to deepen its commitments to success of the production.

Promotional articles were planted in movie magazines that were careful to counter any residual anti-German prejudices. Von Stroheim's personal character was praised and readers reminded of his American citizenship—a citizenship he would not possess for almost seven years.  Press releases assured moviegoers that he had relinquished his royal title of Count and dropped the nobiliary particle “von” .

The methods von Stroheim used to extract impressive performances from his actors were effective, but it required immense amounts of raw footage. Key scenes were performed and re-performed again and again until an “ideal” was provoked, often at the price of frustrating the cast and crew. Von Stroheim was then confronted with the task of sifting through this dross-like footage to discover the gems he had elicited on the set.

By mid-summer studio executives, wishing to expedite its release, submitted the partially edited footage to Grant Whytock, who prepared the final cut for distribution. Universal was sanguine about the prospects for a commercially and critically successful film. A press screening elicited fulsome praise for Blind Husbands and director von Stroheim, including one accolade that anointed him “a direct descendant of [D.W] Griffith.”

When the completed film was delivered to Universal’s New York City sales department to arrange distribution in August 1919, Universal’s vice-president, R. H. Cochrane, emphatically rejected the title of the film The Pinnacle. (n.b. The movie’s climax and denouement occurs at the top of an alpine peak). Film titles, then strictly within the domain of sales and exhibition personnel, initiated a search for a new title. Von Stroheim, outraged, placed a full-page protest in Motion Picture News, without effect. Blind Husbands opened at Washington’s Rialto Theater on 19 October 1919.

Critical response

In an effort to maximize anticipated profits for Blind Husbands, Universal launched a massive promotional campaign. Nationwide, the picture grossed over $325,000 in receipts during its first year when typical five-reel feature films averaged $55,000.

Universal’s productions, which usually exhibited in less exalted venues, arranged for Blind Husbands to run at New York’s “palatial” Capitol Theater though this required a months-long delay. Blind Husbands inspired fulsome responses from American film critics and “almost without exception” both director and his cinematic creation were hailed as an advance for the art form.

Agnes Smith of the New York Telegraph wrote:

Theme

Blind Husbands, set amidst a tourist resort in the Austrian Dolomites, opens with the arrival of an upper-middle American couple, Dr. Robert Armstrong and his wife Margaret. The story examines their reaction to the strenuous efforts of an Austrian military officer, Lieutenant Eric von Steuben, to seduce Margaret. Von Stroheim’s characterization of an unscrupulous yet sophisticated sexual predator was a refined variation of his role of “the man you love to hate” that he had cultivated in his post-WWI roles, most recently in Universal’s The Heart of Humanity (1918). Here, however, von Stroheim seeks sexual conquest through low cunning, rather than with psychological terror and physical violence.

The original title of the movie, The Pinnacle, was based on von Stroheim's original screenplay and served as a metaphor that resonated physiologically with the picture’s climax, in which Dr. Armstrong and Lieutenant von Steuben struggle for dominance on a lofty alpine mountain peak. Von Stroheim, outraged at Universal’s substitution of the title with Blind Husbands, provoked a public denunciation from the director, defending The Pinnacle as “a meaningful title, a title that meant everything to the man who created [the film].” The title Blind Husbands invokes the “aristocratic American visitors” and Dr. Armstrong, who “fails to exhibit any signs of romantic affection” towards his attractive wife, a failure that the “lounge lizard” von Steuben expects to exploit. The complacent doctor, preoccupied with his alpine hiking, is slow to discern his wife’s conflicted response to the officer’s advances.

Blind Husbands is the only film in which von Stroheim submits members of America’s leisure class to artistic analysis. This is the same social stratum that the young von Stroheim had serviced as an expert equestrian and a resort guide in Northern California during the years before World War I and before his arrival in Hollywood, a venue where “he seems to have had particular success with the ladies.”

Whereas von Stroheim’s scenario for Blind Husbands required that his “alter ego” suffer a spectacular death, his subsequent autobiographical representations avoid similar fates.

A religious component appears in the film to reinforce the film's central metaphor that culminates in a contest on the “pinnacle”. Informed by von Stroheim’s recent conversion to Catholicism, Blind Husbands’ romantic triangle unfolds during a local celebration of the Gala Peter and the reenactment of Christ’s transfiguration on Mt. Tabor, an unambiguous reference to the film’s central theme.

The most striking element in von Stroheim’s thematic scheme is the presentation of a young married woman who seriously contemplates engaging in an extramarital affair, which constitutes “a daring break with tradition” in cinematic treatments of the topic. The realism that von Stroheim brings to the first encounter among the principle characters establishes the “psychological complexity” of this theme. According to film historian Richard Koszarski:

That the film and its theme arise from von Stroheim’s own life experiences is “beyond question’: the characterization of Lieutenant Eric von Stuben “is a direct projection of von Stroheim himself.”

Accolades
The film is recognized by American Film Institute in these lists:
 2002: AFI's 100 Years...100 Passions – Nominated

Survival status
A copy of Blind Husbands is in the Museum of Modern Art film archive and in several other collections.

References

Sources
Gallagher, Cullen et al. 2009. Oh, the Depravity! The Cinema of Erich von Stroheim. Retrieved 28 August 2020.
Higham, Charles. 1973. The Art of the American Film: 1900-1971. Doubleday & Company, Inc. New York. . Library of Congress Catalog Card Number 70-186026.
Koszarski, Richard. 1983. The Man You Loved to Hate: Erich von Stroheim and Hollywood. Oxford University Press.

External links

 
 
 
 

1919 films
1919 drama films
Silent American drama films
American silent feature films
Films directed by Erich von Stroheim
American black-and-white films
Films set in Austria
Films set in Italy
Films set in the Alps
Mountaineering films
Universal Pictures films
Articles containing video clips
1919 directorial debut films
1910s American films
Silent adventure films